Calotrophon hemmenorum is a species of sea snail, a marine gastropod mollusk in the family Muricidae, the murex snails or rock snails.

Description
The adult shell attains a length of 20 mm.

Distribution
This species is distributed in the Indian Ocean along Somalia.

References

 Merle D., Garrigues B. & Pointier J.-P. (2011) Fossil and Recent Muricidae of the world. Part Muricinae. Hackenheim: Conchbooks. 648 pp. page(s): 196

External links
 

Endemic fauna of Somalia
Muricidae
Gastropods described in 1990